Seiyōdō Bunshōjo (青陽堂 文章女 1764–1838) was a Japanese netsuke carver and haiku writer. She was Seiyōdō Tomiharu's daughter. Her work can be seen at the Walters Art Museum.

References

External links 

1764 births
1838 deaths
Japanese sculptors
Japanese women sculptors
Japanese women poets
18th-century sculptors
19th-century sculptors
Netsuke-shi